Kathleen Le Rossignol (22 July 1908 – 6 March 2001) was a British diver. She competed in the women's 10 metre platform event at the 1928 Summer Olympics.

References

External links
 

1908 births
2001 deaths
British female divers
Olympic divers of Great Britain
Divers at the 1928 Summer Olympics
People from Saint Helier